Lubowidz  is a village in the administrative district of Gmina Nowa Wieś Lęborska, within Lębork County, Pomeranian Voivodeship, in northern Poland.

The village has been documented since 1400, first as Lubovese (meaning "Lubo's Meadow"), then in 1455 as Luggewiese. The Polish wording of the name in the form Lubowidze appears in 1686. The Geographical Dictionary of the Kingdom of Poland from 1884 mentions the village "Ługi" aka "Luggewiese". 

A cemetery of the Wielbark culture dating from the 1st to the 2nd century AD was discovered near the village. The first chronological phase of this culture was named after the place. About 2 km south of the village is a hill called Glinniki (German: Lehmberg).

For details of the history of the region, see History of Pomerania.

The village has a population of 393.

References

Lubowidz